The buffy broad-nosed bat (Platyrrhinus infuscus) is a bat species found in Bolivia, western Brazil, Colombia, Ecuador, and Peru.

References

Platyrrhinus
Bats of South America
Bats of Brazil
Mammals of Bolivia
Mammals of Colombia
Mammals of Ecuador
Mammals of Peru
Mammals described in 1880
Taxa named by Wilhelm Peters